The DSD Bridge across the Cheyenne River in Wyoming is a single-span truss bridge built circa 1915. The steel seven-panel Pennsylvania truss spans  on Niobrara County Road CN14-46. It was placed on the National Register of Historic Places as part of a thematic study of Wyoming river crossings in 1985.

See also
List of bridges documented by the Historic American Engineering Record in Wyoming

References

External links

 at the National Park Service's NRHP database

Road bridges on the National Register of Historic Places in Wyoming
Buildings and structures in Niobrara County, Wyoming
Bridges completed in 1915
Transportation in Niobrara County, Wyoming
Historic American Engineering Record in Wyoming
National Register of Historic Places in Niobrara County, Wyoming
Steel bridges in the United States
Pennsylvania truss bridges in the United States
1915 establishments in Wyoming